Ringa Ringa Roses is an Indian action, horror and thriller TV show, which has premiered on 30 November 2013. It aired on Life OK on Saturday and Sunday. 
 
The story is about a young girl, Maitri who believes her father is a superhero, who fights against ghosts.

Cast
 Samir Soni as JD, Maitri's father 
 Megha Gupta as Aliya, JD's wife and Maitri's mother 
 Manoj Verma as Jaffar - Research Specialist
 Rishabh Chaddha as Subbu, a Data analyst
 Abigail Jain as Maria, the Intern
 Roshni Walia as Maitri, the Girl
 Kunal Bhatia as Rohit, the father
 Simran Natekar as Ruhi

See also
 List of Hindi horror shows

References

External links
 

Indian drama television series
Indian television soap operas
2013 Indian television series debuts
2014 Indian television series endings
Life OK original programming